Adobe Story is a discontinued collaborative script development tool from Adobe Inc. It included scheduling tools, allowing schedules to be created from one or many scripts. Adobe Story was tightly integrated with Adobe Creative Cloud. It was available as a web-based application, a desktop application, and a mobile app. The desktop application could sync with the online version.

Discontinuation 

On January 23, 2018, Adobe announced that they would be discontinuing Adobe Story CC and Adobe Story CC Classic on January 22, 2019. Adobe recommends customers to migrate data using from with various data export options as Adobe states they will delete all the data after the discontinuation.

References

No external links

Story
Collaborative software
Story
Screenwriting software